The Arena is a direct-to-video film from producer Roger Corman on the subject of female gladiators. It is a remake of the 1974 The Arena with Pam Grier. It was shot in Russia by Kazakh  director Timur Bekmambetov with a Russian crew and it featured Playboy Playmates Karen McDougal and Lisa Dergan, in their feature film debut, playing Amazon slaves forced to be gladiators in a Roman arena.

Cast 
 Karen McDougal as Jessemina
 Lisa Dergan as Bodicia
Olga Sutulova as Livia
 Yulia Chicherina as Diedra
 Viktor Verzhbitsky as Timarchus

References

External links

The Arena review by Joe Bob Briggs
The Arena at gladiatrix.info

2001 direct-to-video films
2001 films
Direct-to-video drama films
Remakes of American films
Films directed by Timur Bekmambetov
2001 drama films
American remakes of Italian films
Films set in ancient Rome
Films set in the Roman Empire
Films about gladiatorial combat
Bazelevs Company films
2000s English-language films